The 71st New York Film Critics Circle Awards, honoring the best in film for 2005, were announced on 12 December 2005 and presented on 8 January 2006.

Winners

Best Actor: 
Heath Ledger – Brokeback Mountain
Runners-up: Philip Seymour Hoffman – Capote and Viggo Mortensen – A History of Violence
Best Actress: 
Reese Witherspoon – Walk the Line
Runners-up: Emmanuelle Devos – Kings and Queen (Rois et reine) and Zhang Ziyi – 2046 and Memoirs of a Geisha
Best Animated Feature: 
Howl's Moving Castle (Hauru no ugoku shiro)
Runners-up: Wallace & Gromit: The Curse of the Were-Rabbit and Corpse Bride
Best Cinematography: 
Christopher Doyle, Lai Yiu Fai, and Kwan Pun Leung – 2046
Runners-up: Robert Elswit – Good Night, and Good Luck. and Emmanuel Lubezki – The New World
Best Director: 
Ang Lee – Brokeback Mountain
Runners-up: David Cronenberg – A History of Violence and Steven Spielberg – Munich
Best Film: 
Brokeback Mountain
Runners-up: A History of Violence and Good Night, and Good Luck.
Best First Film: 
Bennett Miller – Capote
Runners-up: Miranda July – Me and You and Everyone We Know and Phil Morrison – Junebug
Best Foreign Language Film: 
2046 • China/France/Germany/Hong Kong
Runners-up: Caché • France/Austria and Look at Me (Comme une image) • France
Best Non-Fiction Film (tie): 
Grizzly Man
The White Diamond
Runners-up: March of the Penguins and The Aristocrats
Best Screenplay: 
Noah Baumbach – The Squid and the Whale
Runners-up: Larry McMurtry and Diana Ossana – Brokeback Mountain and Tony Kushner and Eric Roth – Munich
Best Supporting Actor: 
William Hurt – A History of Violence
Runners-up: Mathieu Amalric – Munich and Terrence Howard – Crash
Best Supporting Actress: 
Maria Bello – A History of Violence
Runners-up: Catherine Keener – The 40-Year-Old Virgin, The Ballad of Jack and Rose, and Capote and Diane Keaton – The Family Stone

References

External links
 2005 Awards

2005
New York Film Critics Circle Awards, 2005
2005 in American cinema
New
New York

ja:第71回ニューヨーク映画批評家協会賞